Bradley Moore Davis (November 19, 1871 – March 13, 1957) was an American botanist, born in Chicago, Illinois.  After graduating from Leland Stanford Junior University, in 1892, he studied at Harvard, Bonn, and Naples.  For 11 years he taught at the University of Chicago, from 1902 to 1906 as assistant professor of plant morphology.  He held a position at the Marine Biological Laboratory, Woods Hole, Mass. (1897–1905) and at the Bureau of Fisheries.  In 1911 he became assistant professor of botany at the University of Pennsylvania, and  he was secretary of the American Society of Naturalists in 1914.  Besides special articles on the morphology and cytology of algæ, fungi, and liverworts, and studies in the Œnothera, he was coauthor with J. Y. Bergen of Principles of Botany (1906) and Laboratory and Field Manual of Botany (1907).

References

External links
 

Stanford University alumni
Harvard University alumni
University of Chicago faculty
People from Chicago
American botanists
1871 births
1957 deaths
American science writers